"Thou Shalt Not Steal" is a song written by John D. Loudermilk and performed by Dick and Dee Dee. The song was produced by Don Ralke and The Wilder Brothers.

Chart performance
It reached #13 on the Billboard chart in 1964.  The song was also released in the United Kingdom as a single, but it did not chart.  The song was featured on their 1965 album, Thou Shalt Not Steal.

Other versions
Loudermilk released the original version of the song in 1962 where it reached #73 on the Billboard chart.
Glenda Collins released a version as a single in the UK in 1965.
The Pleazers released a version of the song as part of an EP in New Zealand in 1966.
The Newbeats released a version as a single in 1969 where it reached #128 on the Billboard chart.

References

1962 songs
1962 singles
1964 singles
1965 singles
1969 singles
Songs written by John D. Loudermilk
Dick and Dee Dee songs
The Newbeats songs
RCA Records singles
Warner Records singles